Téo & Téa is the sixteenth studio album by French electronic musician and composer Jean-Michel Jarre, released in 2007 on Aero Productions and Warner Music labels. Two singles were released, the first, "Téo & Téa", as a promotional for clubs and radio stations and then as a general release. The second, "Vintage", was released in digital download format only, in July 16, 2007, and included two remixes by ATB.

The album describes the different stages of a loving relationship, and explores the idea that the length of such relationships is unpredictable. Its release demonstrated a move away from virtual instruments and computers that Jarre had been using up to that point; he instead chose to use a simplified range of devices, including several new prototype instruments. The album's cover was inspired by the David Lynch film Wild at Heart. Jarre's then-wife, Anne Parillaud, provided wailing to the track "Beautiful Agony".

Release 
The album was released on CD in 2007 by Aero Productions and Warner Music labels. It was also released with a bonus DVD which features the same tracks mixed for 5.1 surround sound, as well as the video clip for the title track in high-definition, viewable on personal computers. The two computer-generated characters which appeared in the video clip of the title track are "like twins", one is male and one is female.

Critical reception 
The Guardian writer Dave Simpson described the album melodies as "infantile", commenting that they "sound like a music-shop demonstration room in 1979". IndieLondon classified the album as "incredibly lively and sets the tone for the tracks that follow." Thom Jurek of AllMusic wrote "he may be retro but he's far from tired".

Track listing

Personnel 
Personnel listed in album liner notes:
 Jean-Michel Jarre – keyboards, synthesizers and drum programming: Korg Radias, Moog Voyager, Roland MC-808, Roland Fantom-X-8, Roland V-Synth, Access Virus, SH-201, Pro Tools HD3; vocals (Vocoder-filtered) on "In the Mood for You"
 Claude Samard – string arrangements, guitars, programming, Cubase, Digital Performer, Pro Tools HD3
 Francis Rimbert – keyboards and synthesizers: Roland Fantom-X8, V-Synth, Pro Tools Digi002
 Tim Hüfken – Groove Box special programming and artistic collaboration: Roland MC-808 Groovebox and Sonar Sequencer
 Bertrand Lajaudie – additional programming
 Anne Parillaud – additional vocals on "Beautiful Agony"

Charts

References

External links 
 Téo & Téa at Discogs

2007 albums
Jean-Michel Jarre albums
Concept albums